Mothers is the plural form of mother.

Mothers may also refer to:

Film
 Mothers (2010 film), a Macedonian film by Milčo Mančevski
 Mothers (2017 Italian film), directed by Liana Marabini
 Mothers (2017 South Korean film), directed by Lee Dong-eun

Music
 Mothers (album), by Swim Deep, 2015
 Mothers (band), an American folk rock band
 The Mothers of Invention or just The Mothers, an American rock band led by Frank Zappa
 Mothers (music venue), a former club in Birmingham, England

Other uses
 Mothers (Tokyo Stock Exchange), a market of the Tokyo Stock Exchange
 Mother's Cookies, a food brand owned by Kellogg
 The Mothers (novel), by Brit Bennett, 2016

See also
 Mother (disambiguation)